Eduard de Ignacio-Simó Abad (born 3 March 2000) is a field hockey player from Spain, who plays as a Forward.

Career

Club level
In the Spanish División de Honor, De Ignacio-Simó plays for CD Terrassa.

Spain

Under–21
In 2021, De Ignacio-Simó was a member of the Spanish U–21 team at the FIH Junior World Cup in Bhubaneswar.

Los Redsticks
De Ignacio-Simó made his debut for Los Redsticks in 2022, during a test match against the Netherlands in Cádiz. He was later named in the national squad for season three of the FIH Pro League.

References

External links
 
 

2000 births
Living people
Male field hockey forwards
Spanish male field hockey players